The Dawn of DNA is a 1984 role-playing game adventure for Villains and Vigilantes published by Fantasy Games Unlimited.

Plot summary
The Dawn of DNA is an adventure scenario that pits superheroic player characters against the insidious Doctor DNA and his European supervillain flunkies, the Errants.

Reception
William A. Barton reviewed The Dawn of DNA in Space Gamer No. 71. Barton commented that "The Dawn of DNA is a solid, if not overly spectacular or innovative, adventure that could easily occupy an afternoon or evening of play for characters of any of the current superhero RPGs available."

References

Role-playing game supplements introduced in 1984
Villains and Vigilantes adventures